John L. Richards was a one-term mayor of South Norwalk, Connecticut in 1886.

He served as an assessor in Norwalk in 1901 and 1903.

References 

Mayors of Norwalk, Connecticut
Year of birth missing
Year of death missing